Großheringen station is a railway station in the municipality of Großheringen, located in the Weimarer Land district in Thuringia, Germany.

References

Railway stations in Thuringia
Buildings and structures in Weimarer Land
Railway stations in Germany opened in 1874